Luzon earthquake may refer to:
1645 Luzon earthquake, the earthquake on Luzon Island in the Philippines that occurred on November 30, 1645
1880 Luzon earthquakes, the series of earthquakes that affected Manila and most of Luzon in July 1880
1990 Luzon earthquake, the earthquake on Luzon Island in the Philippines that occurred on July 16, 1990
1999 Luzon earthquake, the earthquake on Luzon Island in the Philippines that occurred on December 12, 1999
2019 Luzon earthquake, the earthquake on Luzon Island in the Philippines that occurred on April 22, 2019
2022 Luzon earthquake, the earthquake on Luzon Island in the Philippines that occurred on July 27, 2022

See also
1968 Casiguran earthquake, the earthquake on Luzon Island in the Philippines that occurred on August 2, 1968
List of earthquakes in the Philippines